Gary Day is a British academic and lecturer in English literature at De Montfort University, Leicester.

He has written books on F. R. Leavis, literary criticism and class, and is also co-editor (with Jack Lynch) for the Wiley Encyclopedia of Eighteenth Century Literature. Day held a satirical column in Times Higher Education for a number of years and now reviews television programmes for the same publication.

Books

External links 
Day's staff webpage, De Montfort University

Living people
Academics of De Montfort University
Year of birth missing (living people)